Angel Mariano de Morales y Jasso (born 1784 in Tangancícuaro) was a Mexican clergyman and bishop for the Roman Catholic Archdiocese of Antequera, Oaxaca, and earlier for Sonora. He was ordained in 1832. He was appointed bishop in 1841. He died in 1843.

References 

1784 births
1843 deaths
Mexican Roman Catholic bishops
People from Michoacán